The 2006 CIS football season began on September 2, 2006, and concluded with the 42nd Vanier Cup national championship on November 25 at Griffiths Stadium in Saskatoon, Saskatchewan, with the Laval Rouge et Or winning their fourth championship. Twenty-seven universities across Canada competed in CIS football this season, the highest level of amateur play in Canadian football, under the auspices of Canadian Interuniversity Sport (CIS).

Awards and records

Awards 
 Hec Crighton Trophy – Daryl Stephenson, Windsor
 Presidents' Trophy – Patrick Donovan, Concordia
 Russ Jackson Award – Naim El-Far, Ottawa
 J. P. Metras Trophy – Chris Best, Waterloo
 Peter Gorman Trophy – Dalin Tollestrup, Calgary

All-Canadian team 
 First Team 
Offence
 Teale Orban, QB, Regina
 Chris Ciezki, RB, UBC
 Daryl Stephenson, RB, Windsor
 David McKoy, WR, Guelph
 Brad Smith*, WR, Queen's
 Chris Getzlaf, IR, Regina
 Andy Baechler*, IR, Laurier
 Chris Bauman, IR, Regina
 Kevin Kelly, OL, Ottawa
 Kyle Koch, OL, McMaster
 Adam Rogers, G, Acadia
 Chris Best, LT, Waterlooo
 Jordan Rempel, OL, Saskatchewan
* tie
Defence
 Martin Gagné, DL, Montreal
 Brian Guebert, DL, Saskatchewan
 Nate Finlay, DL, McMaster
 Michaël Jean-Louis, DL, Laval
 Jesse Alexander, LB, Laurier
 Patrick Donovan, LB, Concordia
 Yannick Carter, LB, Laurier
 Corey McNair, DB, Western
 Sammy Okpro, HB, Concordia
 Anthony Plante-Ajah, DB, Ottawa
 Modibo Sidibe, CB, Concordia
 Dylan Barker, S, Saskatchewan

Special Teams
 Derek Schiavone, P, Western
 Derek Schiavone, K, Western
 Second Team 
Offence
 Joshua Sacobie, QB, Ottawa
 Andre Sadeghian, RB, McMaster
 Pierre-Luc Yao, RB, Laval
 Matt Carter, IR, Acadia
 Glenn Mackay, IR, Windsor
 Greg Hetherington, SB, McGill
 Alexandre Zara, OL, Montréal
 Ben Walsh, OG, McGill
 Keith Dauper, OT, Concordia
 Hubert Buydens, OL, Saskatchewan
 Scott Evans, OL, Laurier
Defence
 Clayton Chiurka, DL, Saint Mary's
 Simon Patrick, DL, Manitoba
 Steve Faoro, LB, Acadia
 Cory Huclack, LB, Manitoba
 Stephen Wilson, LB, Regina
 Justin Phillips, DB, Laurier
 Jordy Burrows, DB, Saskatchewan
 Jock Gemmell, DB, Mount Allison
 Josh Maltin, DB, Laurier
 Jeff Zelinski, DB, Saint Mary's
 Elliott Richardson, S, Acadia

Special Teams
 Braden Suchan, P, Saskatchewan
 James Michener, K, Acadia

Results

Regular season standings 
Note: GP = Games Played, W = Wins, L = Losses, OTL = Overtime Losses, PF = Points For, PA = Points Against, Pts = Points

Teams in bold have earned playoff berths.

Top 10

Ranks in italics'' are teams not ranked in the top 10 poll but received votes.
NR = Not Ranked, received no votes.

Championships 
The Vanier Cup is played between the champions of the Mitchell Bowl and the Uteck Bowl, the national semi-final games. In 2007, according to the rotating schedule, the winners of the Canada West conference Hardy Trophy meet the Ontario conference's Yates Cup champion for the Mitchell Bowl. The winners of the Atlantic conference Loney Bowl championship travel to the Dunsmore Cup Quebec championship team for the Uteck Bowl.

Vanier Cup

Playoff bracket

Notes 

U Sports football seasons
CIS football season